Two ships of the United States Navy have been named Cassin, in honor of Captain Stephen Cassin.

 , was a destroyer commissioned in 1913.
 , was a destroyer that served during World War II.

See also

United States Navy ship names